This article lists the largest companies in Indonesia in terms of their revenue, net profit and total assets, according to the American business magazines Fortune and Forbes.

2021 Fortune list 
This list displays all Indonesian companies in the Fortune Global 500, which ranks the world's largest companies by annual revenue. The 2021 figures below are given in millions of US dollars and reflect the fiscal year 2020. Also listed are the headquarters location, net profit, number of employees worldwide and industry sector of each company.

2021 Forbes list 

This table reflects the Forbes Global 2000 list, which ranks the world's 2,000 largest publicly traded companies. "The Global 2000" list is assembled based on factors including revenue, net profit, total assets and market value; each element is assigned a weighted rank in terms of importance when assessing the overall ranking. The table below also lists the headquarters location and industry sector of each company. The figures are in billions of U.S. dollars, for the year 2022. All seven Indonesian companies listed on "The Global 2000" are included in the table below.

See also 

 Economy of Indonesia
 List of companies of Indonesia
 List of largest companies by revenue

References 

Indonesia

companies